"You Belong with Me" is a song by American singer-songwriter Taylor Swift, taken from her second studio album Fearless (2008). Swift wrote the song with Liz Rose and produced it with Nathan Chapman. Inspired by a phone call between a male friend of hers and his girlfriend that she overheard, the lyrics are about an insecure protagonist's unrequited love for an out-of-reach interest. A country pop and power pop song, "You Belong with Me" features a banjo-led production incorporating new wave electric guitars in the mix. Big Machine Records released the song as the third single from Fearless on April 20, 2009.

Critics lauded the song's radio-friendly appeal and emotional sentiments, though some felt that it demonstrated Swift's formulaic and repetitive songwriting. At the 2010 Grammy Awards, "You Belong with Me" received nominations for Song of the Year, Record of the Year, and Best Female Pop Vocal Performance. The single reached the top ten on charts and received sales certifications in Australia, Canada, Japan, and New Zealand. In the U.S., driven by non-country airplay, it peaked at number two on the Billboard Hot 100 and was the first country song to reach number one on the all-genre Radio Songs chart. The single was certified seven times platinum by the Recording Industry Association of America (RIAA).

"You Belong with Me" was ranked among the greatest songs of the 2000s decade by CMT and VH1. The song's music video, directed by Roman White, features Swift portraying two characters: an ordinary girl (the protagonist and narrator) and a popular girl (the antagonist and girlfriend); Lucas Till portrays the male lead. The protagonist secretively loves the male lead, who has an unsympathetic girlfriend. The video won Best Female Video at the 2009 MTV Video Music Awards; during Swift's acceptance speech, Kanye West interrupted, which caused a controversy widely covered by the media. "You Belong with Me" was included on the regular set lists of four of Swift's world tours: the Fearless Tour (2009–2010), the Speak Now World Tour (2011–2012), the Red Tour (2013–2014), and the Reputation Stadium Tour (2018).

Background and release
Swift became inspired to write "You Belong with Me" after she overheard a male friend of hers speaking to his girlfriend on the phone. He acted defensive as his girlfriend yelled at him, and said to her, "No, baby...I had to get off the phone really quickly... I tried to call you right back... Of course I love you. More than anything! Baby, I’m so sorry." Out of the sympathy she felt towards him in the situation, Swift developed a concept for a song. In a writing session with co-writer Liz Rose, Swift explained the situation along with her idea and conceived the song's opening line, "You’re on the phone with your girlfriend / she’s upset / she's going off about something that you said." Together, they developed a story line, which described Swift being in love with the male friend and her having the desire for him to break up with his current girlfriend for her. Swift described the song's concept as "basically about wanting someone who is with this girl who doesn't appreciate him at all. Basically like 'girl-next-door-itis.' You like this guy who you have known for your whole life, and you know him better than she does but somehow the popular girl gets the guy every time." Swift recalled, "It was really fun for us to write the line, 'She wears short skirts, I wear T-shirts'."

"You Belong with Me" was released for digital download exclusively onto the iTunes Store in November 2008, as part of the program "Countdown to Fearless". Big Machine Records released the song to US country radio on April 20, 2009, as the third single from Fearless. The track was released to US contemporary hit radio on May 18, 2009, by Big Machine in partnership with Republic Records.

Music and lyrics

Musicologist James E. Perone characterized "You Belong with Me" as a country pop song. Many critics noted a prominent pop production. Jody Rosen, in a profile for New York, categorized it as a power pop song with a "country twang" and said that Swift sings with a Southern accent. In a review for Billboard, Chris Williams labelled it as a "country rocker with enough of a pop sheen" that is appropriate for multiple radio formats. Kate Kiefer of Paste thought that the song is straightforward pop, and Tom Breihan from Pitchfork found it to be a "gazillion-dollar middle ground" between country and radio-friendly pop. The banjo-led introduction incorporates new wave electric guitars. The bridge contains influences of rock and roll. Perone noted prominent influences of 1980s new wave rock through the tempo and repeated eighth notes in the instruments. He deemed it "highly unusual" that the country instruments such as banjo, fiddle, and mandolin "join the steady eighth-note texture".

In the lyrics, the narrator expresses her feelings for a male friend who is in a relationship with another girl. The lyrics incorporate high-school imagery; the narrator situates herself as a typical girl who sees herself as an underdog compared to the male friend's popular, more attractive cheerleader girlfriend. She tries to compete with the girlfriend to get the boy's attention. The verses contrast the two girls, "She wears high heels, I wear sneakers/ She's cheer captain and I'm on the bleachers." In the refrain, the narrator attempts to persuade the male friend to acknowledge her charm. Breihan found the narrative lyrics reminiscent of "the most fragile, heartbroken strains twee indie pop". Critic Ken Tucker in NPR observed that the lyrics and vocal performance are full of "intense ache" effectively conveying adolescent yearning. Rosen commented that contrary to Swift's status as a successful and popular figure, her self-image as an underdog on "You Belong with Me" contributed to her relatability.

Critical reception
In Fearless album reviews, Rob Sheffield from Blender, Josh Love from The Village Voice, and Leah Greenblatt from Entertainment Weekly selected "You Belong with Me" as an album highlight, noting the radio-friendly production. Love commented that the lyrics showcased Swift's "preternatural wisdom and inclusiveness". Chris Richards from The Washington Post praised the combination of country with new wave guitars and selected it as one of Fearless best tracks. Other critics were more reserved in their praise. Williams lauded the crossover appeal and contended that although the lyrics might come off as immature, the song proved resonant with Swift's core audience of teenagers as well as those who wish to relive their high-school days. In an article for Slant Magazine discussing nominees for the 2010 Grammy Awards, Jonathan Keefe remarked although "You Belong with Me" is not Swift's best-written song, it stood out among other contenders because of her songwriting craftsmanship. On a negative side, Johnny Davis of The Observer commented the lyrics' high-school imagery "may needle British ears". The St. Petersburg Times complained that the song was generic and similar to any of Swift's previous releases.

In retrospect, Nate Jones from Vulture (2021) deemed it her best song in her 179-song discography, lauding it as a "classic" song about high-school feelings and wrote: "The line about short skirts and T-shirts will likely be mentioned in Swift’s obituary one day." In a 2020 ranking of Swift's 161-song repertoire, Hannah Mylrea of NME placed it at number 22. Sheffield in his 2021 ranking of Swift's 206 tracks, meanwhile, placed it at number 113. Alexis Petridis from The Guardian said that although it is a well-written song, it was somewhat less impactful than Fearless lead single, "Love Story". Some critics remarked that its radio-friendly production and pop crossover appeal preceded Swift's subsequent career move from country to mainstream pop.

Accolades
"You Belong with Me" featured on 2009 year-end lists by Pitchfork at number 69 and The Village Voice Pazz & Jop critics' poll at number 10. The song was ranked among the greatest songs of the 2000s decade by CMT (number eight) and VH1 (number 50). Billboard included "You Belong with Me" in their 2017 list of the "100 Greatest Choruses of the 21st Century", writing: "There were about a dozen moments ... you could point to as proof that Taylor Swift would one day become the biggest pop star in the world, but maybe none bigger than the immaculate chorus of ['You Belong With Me']." It ranked first on Teen Vogue'''s 2020 list of the "91 Best Songs About Unrequited Love".

At the 2010 Grammy Awards, "You Belong with Me" received three nominations: Song of the Year (lost to Beyoncé's "Single Ladies (Put a Ring on It)"), Record of the Year (lost to Kings of Leon's "Use Somebody"), and Best Female Pop Vocal Performance (lost to Beyoncé's "Halo"). It won Favorite Song at the 2010 Kids Choice Awards and was nominated for Song of the Year at the 45th Academy of Country Music Awards, but lost to Lady A's "Need You Now" (2009). At the 2010 BMI Country Awards, which was organized by Broadcast Music, Inc. to honor the year's most-performed country songs on U.S. radio on television, "You Belong with Me" made Swift the first songwriter to win Song of the Year three times in a row, after she had won for "Teardrops on My Guitar" in 2008 and "Love Story" in 2009.

Chart performance
"You Belong with Me" debuted at number 12 on the Billboard Hot 100 chart dated November 22, 2008. Following its single release, the song moved to number three on the week ending August 15, 2009. Driven by non-country radio airplay, it gained the largest crossover radio audience since Faith Hill's "Breathe" (2000). The following week, the single peaked at number two on the Billboard Hot 100. On the Radio Songs chart, "You Belong with Me" was Swift's first number-one song and the first country crossover to reach number one since Billboard began incorporating Nielsen BDS-monitored data in 1990. It stayed at number one for two consecutive weeks and spent 49 weeks in total. On other airplay charts, "You Belong with Me" spent two weeks at number one on Hot Country Songs and 14 weeks at number one on Adult Contemporary; and peaked at number two on both the Pop Songs and Adult Pop Songs charts. The single was certified seven times platinum by the Recording Industry Association of America (RIAA) for sales and streaming exceeding seven million units. By July 2019, "You Belong with Me" had sold 4.9 million copies in the United States.

"You Belong with Me" peaked within the top ten on singles charts in Canada (three), Australia (five), New Zealand (five), and Japan (ten). The single peaked within the top 40 in Ireland (12), Slovakia (17), the United Kingdom (30), Hungary (31), and Denmark (32). In Canada, the song reached number one on three airplay charts: Canada Country, Canada CHR/Top 40, and Canada Hot AC. The single was certified platinum in Japan and platinum or multi-platinum in the English-speaking countries including Australia (four times platinum), Canada (double platinum), and New Zealand and the United Kingdom (both platinum).

Music video

The song's accompanying music video was directed by Roman White. In the video, Swift portrays both the protagonist ("the nerd, who is pining away for this guy that she can't have") and antagonist ("the popular girl, horrible and scary and intimidating and perfect"). Actor Lucas Till, whom Swift met while on set of Hannah Montana: The Movie in April 2008, portrays the male lead. In a behind-the-scene video aired on Great American Country, Swift elaborated on the concept: the protagonist wishes she could be in the antagonist's position to be with the boy. Filming took place within two days in Gallatin and Hendersonville in Nashville. In scenes which feature both the protagonist and antagonist, Swift used a body double.

The video starts with Till's character arguing with his girlfriend through a phone call. The protagonist, with big glasses and curly blonde hair, notices and the two communicate by holding up signs through their adjoining bedroom windows. The boy closes his window, not knowing that the blonde holds up a sign saying, "I love you." The blonde, while in her room, tries on different costumes associated with different high-school archetypes and bursts out dance moves without knowing that the boy is watching through his window curtain; White replaced Swift's choreographed moves with what she described as "the dumbest moves". The next day, the blonde is sitting on a bench while reading a book as the boy approaches and talks with her. The antagonist, donning straight brunette hair, arrives and kisses the boy in her car as she gives the blonde a hostile look.

At a football game, the brunette is a cheerleader and the blonde sits on the bleachers, performing in the school band (played by Swift's touring band). After scoring the winning touchdown, the boy finds his girlfriend flirting with a teammate (played by a friend of Swift's brother Austin), resulting in a heated argument as the blonde witnesses. Back at their bedroom windows, the boy and the blonde again communicate through signs; he asks her if she is going to prom, and she says no. The blonde notices the boy's disappointed look and decides to go to the prom in a white dress without her glasses. The brunette approaches the boy, but he ignores her and goes to the blonde instead. Ending the video, the boy and the blonde reveal folded signs saying "I love you" to each other and kiss. Both the football and prom scenes were filmed at Pope John Paul II High School, with the school supplying many extras, including students, band members, cheerleaders, and football players. On the video's conclusion, White explained that it is meant to portray "who she really is", and Swift thought it was a happy ending.

Release and reception

The video premiered on May 2, 2009, on CMT. Chris Ryan of MTV said that it has a similar plot to a rom-com and deemed it the most memorable video on MTV of the year. At the 2009 MTV Video Music Awards, the video won Best Female Video. During Swift's acceptance speech, rapper Kanye West interrupted her, grabbing her microphone and stating, "Yo Taylor, I'm really happy for you and I'ma let you finish, but Beyoncé had one of the best videos of all time", referencing Beyoncé's video for "Single Ladies (Put a Ring on It)", a nominee in the same category. Later in the evening, during her acceptance speech for winning Video of the Year, Beyoncé called Swift from backstage to complete her acceptance speech. Public reaction turned against West; former President of the United States Barack Obama called West a "jackass". West later issued an apology which Swift accepted. Michael Deacon of The Daily Telegraph, in the wake of the controversy, defended West and commented that "You Belong with Me" was "sappy and dull".

The video was nominated for Video of the Year at the 45th Academy of Country Music Awards. At the 2010 CMT Music Awards, the video received nominations for "Video of the Year" and "Female Video of the Year", but lost to Carrie Underwood's "Cowboy Casanova" and Miranda Lambert's "White Liar", respectively. At the 2010 MuchMusic Video Awards, the video was nominated for the MuchMusic Video Award for Best International Artist Video and the MuchMusic Video Award for People's Choice: Favourite International Video, but lost to Miley Cyrus' video for "Party in the U.S.A." and Adam Lambert's video for "Whataya Want From Me", respectively.

Accolades

Live performances

Swift's first televised performance of "You Belong with Me" was at a free outdoor concert on May 29, 2009, broadcast by The Today Show. Following promotion for the song, she performed it on The Tonight Show with Jay Leno, Studio 330 Sessions, at the 2009 CMA Music Festival, at the 2009 CMT Music Awards, and at the 2009 V Festival, in the summer of 2009. Swift performed "You Belong with Me" at the 2009 MTV Video Music Awards on September 13, 2009, the same day in which Kanye West interrupted her acceptance speech. She began the performance in a subway station, dressed in a brown trench coat and black beanie, and continued it in a subway, taking off the trench coat and revealing a red cocktail dress. Once the subway docked at a stop, Swift completed the performance atop a yellow taxi cab. Billboard critics ranked it as the 14th greatest VMAs performance of all time in their 2022 list. Swift later performed the song on The View and Saturday Night Live. In the fall of 2009 and winter of 2009 through 2010, Swift commenced promotion for "You Belong with Me" countries outside of the United States; she performed the song on the United Kingdom channel GMTV, the Australian charity concert Sydney Sound Relief, and the Japanese talk show The Sukkiri Morning Show.

Swift performed a medley, which included "You Belong with Me" at the 52nd Grammy Awards. Wearing casual white blouse and black skinny jeans, Swift performed "Today Was a Fairytale" and then announced, "It's a fairy tale and an honor to share the stage with Stevie Nicks". Following, the two performed a cover of Fleetwood Mac's "Rhiannon" (1976). Swift then grabbed her acoustic guitar for the third and final part in her medley, jumping into a twangy version of "You Belong with Me". Nicks stood back, tapping her tambourine and nodding, every so often stepping up to the microphone to sing with Swift. Eric Ditzian of MTV News was disappointed at Swift's and Nicks' harmonies, but said the two "made for a compelling twosome". The performance followed much backlash in regards to Swift's off key singing, which caused Scott Borchetta, CEO of Big Machine Records, to issue a statement defending the performance.

"You Belong with Me" is performed as the opening number on all 2009 and 2010 dates of Swift's first headlining tour, the Fearless Tour. Before Swift or the dancers entered the stage, a video played on the overhead screens; it showed various celebrities, including Miley Cyrus, Demi Lovato, Faith Hill, Lucas Till and Swift herself, sharing their definitions of the word "fearless". Following the video's completion, the band and backup dancers appeared, dressed in yellow cheerleading uniforms. Swift, dressed in a white marching band uniform, then emerges from the bottom of the stage and commences singing. Swift roams around the stage singing and backup dancers perform cheerleading routines while projections of cheerleaders are shown on the stage. Midway through the performance, the backup dancers removed Swift's marching band uniform to reveal a sparkly cocktail dress; she is then handed a rhinestoned acoustic guitar and finishes the performance. Craig Rosen of The Hollywood Reporter believed Swift's performance of "You Belong with Me", coupled with the performance of "Should've Said No", at the May 22, 2009, concert in Los Angeles at the Staples Center made the show a success. The song was also performed on the Speak Now World Tour and The Red Tour., but was not featured on the regular set list for The 1989 World Tour, making it the first tour set list to do so. However, in several venues, she performed the song, acoustically, in place of "You Are in Love". In 2018, "You Belong With Me" returned to the regular set list during the Reputation Stadium Tour as part of a medley with "Style" and "Love Story".

Cover versions and media usage
In November 2009, American rock singer Butch Walker covered "You Belong with Me" for a digital single release. James Christopher Monger of Allmusic said the cover was infused "with the same karaoke glee that fueled previous installments". Bill Lamb of About.com described the composition as a "folksy almost honky-tonk sound" and "a bit more country than Taylor Swift's original". According to Mikael Wood of Billboard, the cover's instrumentation is fueled by banjo; he claimed it was an "online success". Jonathan Keefe of Slant Magazine described the cover's arrangement as "fantastic" and, to him, it "emphasized the terrific melody and structure that are the song's real selling points". After hearing Walker's cover, Swift posted via her official Twitter account, "I'm losing my MIND listening to it! Blown away." Band Hero for consoles features "You Belong with Me" as one of sixty-five songs from "mainstream acts".

A parody entitled "TMZ" was included on "Weird Al" Yankovic's studio album Alpocalypse (2011). A music video for the parody, directed by Bill Plympton, was filmed in October 2010, and was included on the album's DVD. The music video was released on "Weird Al"'s Vevo on June 24, 2011.

Personnel
Credits adapted from Fearless album liner notes
 Taylor Swift – vocals, songwriter, producer
 Liz Rose – songwriter
 Nathan Chapman – producer
 Steve Blackmon – assistant recording engineer, assistant mixer
 Chad Carslon – recording engineer
 Justin Niebank – mixer

Charts

Weekly charts

Year-end charts

Decade-end chart

All-time chart

 Certifications 

"You Belong with Me (Taylor's Version)"

On April 9, 2021, Swift released Fearless (Taylor's Version), the re-recording of her 2008 album, through Republic Records. The release was part of Swift's actions to claim the rights to her masters, following the 2019 controversy. The re-recording of "You Belong with Me", subtitled "Taylor's Version", is the sixth track on Fearless (Taylor's Version) track list. "You Belong with Me (Taylor's Version)" features the same core production as the original, with a smoother, more nuanced production. Upon the album's release, "You Belong with Me (Taylor's Version)" charted on the official singles charts of Australia, Canada, Ireland, Singapore, the United Kingdom, and the United States.

Critical reception
Critical reception of the track was mainly positive, with most reviews observing the varied vocal delivery. Emily St. James of Vox was impressed by Swift's vocal delivery on the re-recorded version, describing the vocal delivery as stronger due to age and experience. St. James praised Swift's varied approach to her vocal delivery, commenting: "2021 Swift is much more comfortable settling into her natural alto range". She also opined that the perspective of the song's storytelling changes over time, calling the new version warmer and more empathetic. Hannah Mylrea of NME claims the song is "filled with youthful yearning", asserting that Swift revisits the song with kindness and affection. Kitty Empire of The Guardian deemed the production smoother and the quality of playing more nuanced with particular reference to the "interplay between the guitar and banjo".

Personnel
Credits adapted from Fearless (Taylor's Version)'' album liner notes.

 Taylor Swift – lead vocals, songwriter, producer
 Liz Rose – songwriter
 Christopher Rowe – producer, recording engineer
 Max Bernstein – steel guitar
 Matt Billingslea – drums, percussion programming
 Dan Burns – percussion programming
 Caitlin Evanson – background vocals
 Derek Garten – additional engineer
 Serban Ghenea – mixer
 John Hanes – engineer
 Amos Heller – bass guitar
 Mike Meadows – acoustic guitar, banjitar, banjo, mandolin
 David Payne – recording engineer
 Lowell Reynolds – additional engineer
 Paul Sidoti – electric guitar
 Jonathan Yudkin – fiddle

Charts

See also
List of best-selling singles in the United States
List of number-one adult contemporary singles of 2009 (U.S.) and 2010 (U.S.)
List of Hot Country Songs number ones of 2009

References

Source

 

2008 songs
2009 singles
Big Machine Records singles
Taylor Swift songs
Songs written by Liz Rose
Songs written by Taylor Swift
Song recordings produced by Nathan Chapman (record producer)
Song recordings produced by Taylor Swift
Song recordings produced by Chris Rowe
Music videos directed by Roman White
MTV Video Music Award for Best Female Video
American power pop songs
Country pop songs